Timothy Halman (born 1977) is a Canadian politician. He was elected to the Nova Scotia House of Assembly in the 2017 provincial election. A member of the Progressive Conservative Association of Nova Scotia, he represents the electoral district of Dartmouth East. Halman is the PC critic for Education and Early Childhood Development.

Career
Born in Montreal, Quebec, Halman spent most of his youth in Dartmouth, Nova Scotia. He later moved back to Quebec with his family as his father worked in the film industry. He studied at Concordia University before settling in Dartmouth where he pursued his Bachelor's and a master's degree in Education at Mount Saint Vincent University.

Prior to his election to the House of Assembly, Halman was a teacher for Prince Andrew High School.

With the support of his late wife, Ginette Thibault-Halman, he decided to leave the classroom to run as a candidate for the 2017 Nova Scotia general election.

On August 31, 2021, Halman was made Minister of Environment and Climate Change as well as Chair of Treasury Board and Policy Board.

Halman currently lives in Dartmouth, Nova Scotia with his partner, Christine, and their four children.

Bills introduced

Electoral record

References

Anglophone Quebec people
Canadian schoolteachers
Living people
People from Dartmouth, Nova Scotia
Politicians from Montreal
Progressive Conservative Association of Nova Scotia MLAs
Members of the Executive Council of Nova Scotia
21st-century Canadian politicians
1977 births